Revelstoke may refer to:

Places
Revelstoke, British Columbia, a city in British Columbia, Canada
Revelstoke (electoral district), a former provincial electoral district
Revelstoke Airport, the airport serving the city of Revelstoke, British Columbia, Canada
Revelstoke Grizzlies, a junior ice hockey team in Revelstoke, British Columbia, Canada
Revelstoke Lake, a reservoir on the Columbia River behind Revelstoke Dam in British Columbia
Revelstoke Mountain Resort, a ski resort just outside of Revelstoke, British Columbia, Canada
Revelstoke, Devon, a village in the South Hams district of Devon, England

British peerage

Baron Revelstoke, a title in the Peerage of the United Kingdom
Edward Baring, 1st Baron Revelstoke
James Baring, 6th Baron Revelstoke